Mark Willard Clark (born May 12, 1968) is a former right-handed pitcher in Major League Baseball. He pitched all or parts of ten seasons in the majors.

Clark was born in Bath, Illinois, and made his debut on September 6,  for the St. Louis Cardinals. Over the next nine seasons, Clark would develop into a journeyman starting pitcher, being traded from team to team. He pitched in one postseason game in the 1998 National League Division Series for the Chicago Cubs, a game which he lost to John Smoltz and the Atlanta Braves.

He was released by the Texas Rangers during the  season, then retired. He and his wife Amy have two children: a son, Brandon and a daughter, Allyson. They now live in Kilbourne, Illinois. He is now a baseball coach for children in the Kilbourne area.

External links

1968 births
Living people
Arkansas Travelers players
Buffalo Bisons (minor league) players
Charlotte Rangers players
Charlotte Knights players
Chicago Cubs players
Cleveland Indians players
Hamilton Redbirds players
Louisville Redbirds players
Major League Baseball pitchers
Baseball players from Chicago
MacMurray Highlanders baseball players
New York Mets players
People from Mason County, Illinois
Savannah Cardinals players
Savannah Sand Gnats players
St. Louis Cardinals players
St. Petersburg Cardinals players
Texas Rangers players
Lincoln Land Loggers baseball players